Hix is an unincorporated community in Burleson County, Texas, United States. According to the Handbook of Texas, the community had a population of 35 in 2000. It is located within the Bryan-College Station metropolitan area.

History 
Hix was first settled by Benjamin Porter, Merifield Phegley, and their families in 1847. Its original name was Fraim for the Fraim family, who also settled in the area. Macedonia Baptist Church was established here in 1852 and is the third-oldest church in the county. A post office was established there in 1871 and remained in operation until 1874. A Masonic lodge was built here in 1872 until it was disbanded in 1886. Another post office was established at Hix in 1894 and remained in operation until 1909, after which mail was sent to the community from Gause. Also in 1894, Hix had a cotton gin, a blacksmith shop, and a grocery store. Its population was 35 from 1968 through 2000 with no businesses.

Geography

Education 
Hix had its own school in the late-1800s. The community is served by the Caldwell Independent School District.

References

Unincorporated communities in Burleson County, Texas
Unincorporated communities in Texas
Bryan–College Station